Alard is a French surname. Notable people with the surname include:

 Éric Alard, French bobsledder 
 Jean-Delphin Alard (1815–1888), French violinist
 Benjamin Alard (born 1985), French harpsichordist and organist
 Nelly Alard (born 1962), French actress

See also
Allard (surname)

French-language surnames